The 2022 BMW Open was a men's tennis tournament played on outdoor clay courts. It was the 106th edition of the event and part of the ATP Tour 250 series of the 2022 ATP Tour. It took place at the MTTC Iphitos complex in Munich, Germany, from 25 April until 1 May 2022.

Finals

Singles

  Holger Rune def.  Botic van de Zandschulp, 3–4, ret.

Doubles

  Kevin Krawietz /  Andreas Mies def.  Rafael Matos /  David Vega Hernández, 4–6, 6–4, [10–7]

Point distribution

Singles main draw entrants

Seeds

Rankings are as of 18 April 2022.

Other entrants
The following players received wildcards into the main draw:
  Philipp Kohlschreiber
  Max Hans Rehberg
  Holger Rune

The following players received entry from the qualifying draw:
  Egor Gerasimov
  Jiří Lehečka
  Yoshihito Nishioka
  Marko Topo

The following players received entry as lucky losers:
  Norbert Gombos
  Alejandro Tabilo

Withdrawals 
 Before the tournament
  Alexander Bublik → replaced by  Maxime Cressy
  Márton Fucsovics → replaced by  Norbert Gombos
  Tallon Griekspoor → replaced by  John Millman
  Filip Krajinović → replaced by  Alejandro Tabilo
  Jan-Lennard Struff → replaced by  Emil Ruusuvuori

Doubles main draw entrants

Seeds

Rankings are as of 18 April 2022

Other entrants
The following pairs received wildcards into the doubles main draw:
  Yannick Hanfmann /  Daniel Masur
  Philipp Kohlschreiber /  Max Hans Rehberg

The following pairs received entry as alternates:
  Victor Vlad Cornea /  Petros Tsitsipas
  Philip Florig /  Maximilian Homberg

Withdrawals 
  Alexander Bublik /  Ilya Ivashka → replaced by  Lloyd Glasspool /  Harri Heliövaara
  Juan Sebastián Cabal /  Robert Farah → replaced by  Daniel Altmaier /  Oscar Otte
  Márton Fucsovics /  Mackenzie McDonald → replaced by  Victor Vlad Cornea /  Petros Tsitsipas
  Sander Gillé /  Joran Vliegen → replaced by  Philip Florig /  Maximilan Homberg
  Roman Jebavý /  Alex Molčan →  Roman Jebavý /  Andrés Molteni
  Alex de Minaur /  David Vega Hernández → replaced by  Rafael Matos /  David Vega Hernández
  Tim Pütz /  Michael Venus → replaced by  Ivan Sabanov /  Matej Sabanov

References

External links 
Official website

Bavarian International Tennis Championships
BMW Open
BMW Open
BMW Open
BMW Open